New Wave is Against Me!'s fourth full-length studio album and their debut album on Sire Records. Produced by Butch Vig of Nevermind fame, it was released on July 10, 2007. The album's first single, "White People for Peace", was released in May 2007, prior to the album's release. A second single, "Thrash Unreal", followed in July 2007.

The album was #1 on Spin Magazines Album of the Year and #9 on Rolling Stones list of the Top 50 Albums of 2007.

Production 
New Wave is the band's first album with major label Sire Records. Some fans responded negatively to the decision, calling them "sell-outs". Singer/guitarist Laura Jane Grace commented on this, saying "It's just kind of a self-defeating, shoot yourself in the foot-like attitude to have. I find it completely frustrating and off-putting and it turns me off of the punk scene really because people are very closed minded."

The album was originally scheduled for release in the spring of 2007, but was delayed due to mixing issues. Mixing was due to start on February 1, 2007 but it was pushed back to February 9. The band had to start touring on the February 20, so they ended up mixing for ten days before they had to leave. While on tour, producer Butch Vig and mixer Rich Costey would email the band a song which they would then listen to and comment back on.

Tegan Quin's collaboration on "Borne on the FM Waves of the Heart" came about on the 2006 Warped Tour when Quin and a friend were interviewing bands for Canadian music television channel MuchMusic. When her friend said he was going to interview Against Me!, Quin, being a fan of the band, requested to do it instead. During the interview, the band mentioned that they were making a new album to which Quin jokingly said something along the lines of "you should have me sing on the record." Grace was a big fan of Tegan and Sara and liked Quin's voice. Grace had an idea for a duet with Quin and she wrote "Borne on the FM Waves of the Heart" with her voice in mind.

In its January 2008 issue, Spin Magazine named New Wave the best album of 2007.

On June 17, 2008 a deluxe edition of New Wave was released in France on Fargo Records with 5 bonus tracks.

In August 2007, Australian singer-songwriter Ben Lee covered the entire album and released it as a free MP3 download on his blog. Explaining why he decided to cover the album, Lee said "I fell in love with the album. Really. Like, couldn't stop listening to it. As heavy and gnarly as it sounds at times, it is unmistakably a pop masterpiece." Lee's wife, Ione Skye, would later direct the music video for the band's song "333" in 2016.

Chicago musician Mike Kinsella covered the song "Borne On The FM Waves" on his album "Other People's Songs" released under his Owen moniker.

The song "Stop!" appeared in season 6, episode 8 of "One Tree Hill". The song also appeared in the 2008 movie "The Sisterhood of the Traveling Pants 2"

The title track appeared in the 2009 movie I Love You, Beth Cooper.

Commercial performance 
The album debuted at #57 on the Billboard 200 on the week of its release. As of 2010, the album has sold 127,000 copies in the US.

Track listing

B-sides 

A digital release titled New Wave B-Sides compiled several of the available B-sides in one EP. It was made available on Amazon's MP3 download service on July 29, 2008.

The digital release is missing the following released b-sides
 "White People for Peace" (Butch Vig remix) which was previously available on the "White People for Peace" 12" single and iTunes digital download
 "Animal" (acoustic) which was previously available on the "Thrash Unreal" iTunes EP
 "New Wave" (acoustic) which was previously available on the UK "Thrash Unreal" CD single
 "Stop!" (Funky Face vs. The DBL Stops Mix) which was previously available on UK versions of the "Stop!" single

Personnel 
 Laura Jane Grace – vocals, guitar, "Panther" cover
 James Bowman  – guitar, backup vocals
 Andrew Seward – bass, vocals
 Warren Oakes – drums, vocals
 Tegan Quin – additional vocals on "Borne on the FM Waves of the Heart"
 Butch Vig – producer, mixer on "White People for Peace"
 Rich Costey – mixer
 Paul Schiek – photos
 The Small Stakes – layout

Charts

References 

2007 albums
Sire Records albums
Against Me! albums
Albums produced by Butch Vig
Emo albums by American artists